Warren Center is an unincorporated community in Bradford County, Pennsylvania, United States. Warren Center has a post office with ZIP code 18851.

References

Unincorporated communities in Bradford County, Pennsylvania
Unincorporated communities in Pennsylvania